The 1994 NCAA Division III men's basketball tournament was the 20th annual single-elimination tournament to determine the national champions of National Collegiate Athletic Association (NCAA) men's Division III collegiate basketball in the United States.

The field consisted of forty teams, each allocated into one of four sectionals. The national semifinals, third-place final, and championship final were contested in Buffalo, New York.

Lebanon Valley defeated NYU, 66–59 (in overtime), in the final, earning their first national title.

The Flying Dutchmen (28–4) were coached by Pat Flannery.

Future Rice and VCU head coach Mike Rhoades, also from Lebanon Valley, was one of the co-Most Outstanding Players of the tournament.

Championship Rounds
Site: Buffalo, New York

See also
1994 NCAA Division III women's basketball tournament
1994 NCAA Division I men's basketball tournament
1994 NCAA Division II men's basketball tournament
1994 NAIA Division I men's basketball tournament
1994 NAIA Division II men's basketball tournament

References

NCAA Division III men's basketball tournament
NCAA Men's Division III Basketball
Ncaa Tournament